Little River is a city in Rice County, Kansas, United States.  As of the 2020 census, the population of the city was 472.

History

For millennia, the land now known as Kansas was inhabited by Native Americans. In 1803, most of modern Kansas was secured by the United States as part of the Louisiana Purchase. In 1854, the Kansas Territory was organized, then in 1861 Kansas became the 34th U.S. state. In 1867, Rice County was founded.

Little River was founded in 1880. The town was named from its situation upon the Little Arkansas River.

In 1878, Atchison, Topeka and Santa Fe Railway and parties from Marion and McPherson counties chartered the Marion and McPherson Railway Company. In 1879, a branch line was built from Florence to McPherson; in 1880 it was extended to Lyons and in 1881 it was extended to Ellinwood. The line was leased and operated by the Atchison, Topeka and Santa Fe Railway. The line from Florence to Marion, was abandoned in 1968. In 1992, the line from Marion to McPherson was sold to Central Kansas Railway. In 1993, after heavy flood damage, the line from Marion to McPherson was abandoned. The original branch line connected Florence, Marion, Canada, Hillsboro, Lehigh, Canton, Galva, McPherson, Conway, Windom, Little River, Mitchell, Lyons, Chase and Ellinwood.

Geography
Little River is located at  (38.397217, -98.011489).

Demographics

2010 census
As of the census of 2010, there were 557 people, 207 households, and 136 families residing in the city. The racial makeup of the city was 98.2% White, 0.7% Native American, 0.4% from other races, and 0.7% from two or more races. Hispanic or Latino of any race were 1.6% of the population.

There were 207 households, of which 35.3% had children under the age of 18 living with them, 50.7% were married couples living together, 9.2% had a female householder with no husband present, 5.8% had a male householder with no wife present, and 34.3% were non-families. 31.4% of all households were made up of individuals, and 15% had someone living alone who was 65 years of age or older. The average household size was 2.53 and the average family size was 3.20.

The median age in the city was 37.2 years. 28.9% of residents were under the age of 18; 5.3% were between the ages of 18 and 24; 25.9% were from 25 to 44; 19.5% were from 45 to 64; and 20.5% were 65 years of age or older. The gender makeup of the city was 47.9% male and 52.1% female.

2000 census
As of the census of 2000, there were 536 people, 202 households, and 131 families residing in the city. The racial makeup of the city was 97.39% White, 0.37% from other races, and 2.24% from two or more races. Hispanic or Latino of any race were 1.31% of the population.

There were 202 households, out of which 31.2% had children under the age of 18 living with them, 54.0% were married couples living together, 7.9% had a female householder with no husband present, and 35.1% were non-families. 33.2% of all households were made up of individuals, and 20.3% had someone living alone who was 65 years of age or older. The average household size was 2.40 and the average family size was 3.02.

In the city, the population was spread out, with 25.9% under the age of 18, 6.5% from 18 to 24, 24.3% from 25 to 44, 17.0% from 45 to 64, and 26.3% who were 65 years of age or older. The median age was 40 years. For every 100 females, there were 81.7 males. For every 100 females age 18 and over, there were 73.4 males.

The median income for a household in the city was $30,066, and the median income for a family was $33,125. Males had a median income of $26,000 versus $20,833 for females. The per capita income for the city was $13,619. About 16.0% of families and 16.8% of the population were below the poverty line, including 24.6% of those under age 18 and 8.1% of those age 65 or over.

Education
The community is served by Little River–Windom USD 444 public school district.

Sports
The Little River Redskins have won the following Kansas State High School championships:
 1970 Football - Class 1A 
 1971 Football - Class 1A 
 1974 Boys Basketball - Class 1A 
 1976 Girls Track & Field - Class 1A 
 1976 Girls Track & Field (Indoor) - Class 1A 
 1977 Girls Track & Field - Class 1A 
 1978 Girls Track & Field (Indoor) - Class 1A 
 1979 Girls Track & Field - Class 1A  
 1981 Football - Class 1A 
 1984 Girls Volleyball - Class 2A 
 1995 Girls Basketball - Class 1A 
 1996 Football - Class 8-Man DI 
 1996 Girls Basketball - Class 1A 
 1997 Girls Basketball - Class 1A 
 1998 Girls Basketball - Class 1A 
 1999 Football - Class 8-Man DI

See also
 National Register of Historic Places listings in Rice County, Kansas

References

Further reading

External links

 Little River - Directory of Public Officials
 Little River city map, KDOT

Cities in Kansas
Cities in Rice County, Kansas